Spon Lane railway station was a railway station in England,  built by the London and North Western Railway on their Stour Valley Line in 1852. It served the western part of Smethwick.

The station closed in 1964, although the Rugby-Birmingham-Stafford Loop Line from the West Coast Main Line still runs through the site of the station today.

There is little evidence of the location of the station on the ground today, and Smethwick Galton Bridge, which opened in 1995 a short distance to the east, now serves the area.

References

External links
Photos by D J Norton

Disused railway stations in Sandwell
Railway stations in Great Britain opened in 1852
Railway stations in Great Britain closed in 1964
Beeching closures in England
Smethwick
1852 establishments in England